On each side of the interphalangeal joints of the fingers are diagonally placed fibrous bands. The proximal ends of the bands are near the dorsal phalanges of the hand and the distal ends of the bands are near the palmar margins of the digits.

Hand
Ligaments